Melissa is a fictional good sorceress in the Matter of France. She is said to have been an apprentice of Merlin and guards his tomb, though she does not appear in older stories about him.  

In Orlando Furioso, she is instrumental in the love affair of Ruggiero and Bradamante, whom she is determined will one day marry. Whenever their relationship is threatened, she brings them back together. Melissa conjures Ruggiero and Bradamante's descendants and foretells their futures. When Ruggiero has fallen victim to the enchantments of Alcina, she comes to his rescue by restoring his memory of his love for Bradamante, and releasing him from the spell which held him captive on Alcina's Isle. Later, Ruggiero loses a combat to determine who shall win the hand of Bradamante; despondent, he goes into the woods to starve himself to death. Melissa hears of his plight and reveals the truth to him: that he had lost in combat not to his rival, but to Bradamante herself; therefore, there is no reason their wedding cannot proceed.

References

Orlando Furioso, prose translation by Guido Waldman (Oxford, 1999). .
Orlando Furioso, verse translation by Barbara Reynolds in two volumes (Penguin Classics, 1975). Part one (cantos 1-23) ; part two (cantos 24-46) . Part one has since been reprinted.
Orlando furioso ed. Marcello Turchi (Garzanti, 1974)
Orlando Furioso: A Selection ed. Pamela Waley (Manchester University Press, 1975)

Fictional characters introduced in the 16th century
Characters in Orlando Innamorato and Orlando Furioso
Matter of France
Fictional witches
Female characters in literature
Witches in folklore